Corinne Suter (born 28 September 1994) is a Swiss World Cup alpine ski racer specializes in the speed events of downhill and super-G.

Career
Suter made her World Cup debut at age 17 in November 2011, and won season titles in downhill and super-G in 2020. She won the silver in downhill and bronze in Super G at the World Championships  and the gold medal in the downhill at both the 2021 World Championships and the 2022 Winter Olympics followed by a bronze in the downhill at the 2023 World Championships.

World Cup results

Season titles
 2 titles – (1 Super-G, 1 Downhill)

Season standings
{| class="wikitable"  style="font-size:95%; text-align:center; border:gray solid 1px; width:40%;"
|- style="background:#369; color:white;"
| rowspan="2" style="width:4%;"|Season
|- style="background:#4180be; color:white;"
| style="width:3%;"|Age
| style="width:5%;"|Overall
| style="width:5%;"|Slalom
| style="width:5%;"|Giant Slalom
| style="width:5%;"|
| style="width:5%;"|Downhill
| style="width:5%;"|Combined
|-
| 2015 ||20|| 117 || — || — || 54 || 48 || —
|-
| 2016 ||21|| 29 || — || — || 18 || 9 || —
|-
| 2017 ||22|| 33||—||—||13 || 15 || 41
|-
| 2018 ||23|| 34||—||—||15 || 20 || —
|-
| 2019 ||24|| 18||—||—||16 || 6 || —
|-
| 2020 ||25|| 4 || — || — || style="background:gold;"|1 || style="background:gold;" |1 || —
|-
| 2021 ||26|| 8 || — || 30 || style="background:#c96;"|3 || style="background:silver;"|2 || rowspan="3" 
|-
| 2022 ||27||9||— ||45||8|| style="background:silver;"|2
|-
| 2023 ||28||12||—||47||7||4|}

Race podiums
5 wins – (3 DH, 2 SG)
24 podiums – (16 DH, 8 SG)

World Championship results 

Olympic results

References

External links
 
 
  
 Corinne Suter at Swiss Ski Team ''

1994 births
Swiss female alpine skiers
Living people
Alpine skiers at the 2018 Winter Olympics
Alpine skiers at the 2022 Winter Olympics
Olympic alpine skiers of Switzerland
Medalists at the 2022 Winter Olympics
Olympic medalists in alpine skiing
Olympic gold medalists for Switzerland
Sportspeople from the canton of Schwyz
21st-century Swiss women